This is a list of some works by Spanish painter Pablo Picasso, from 1941 on to 1950.

1941 Dora Maar au Chat
1941 Tete de femme (Dora Maar) (in plaster)
1941 Nature Morte
1942 Nature morte à la Guitare
1942 Bull's Head
1943 Buste de femme 43
1944 Plant de Tomato
1944-45 The Charnel House, oil and charcoal on canvas, Museum of Modern Art, New York City
1946 Le Taureau, series of etchings 
1946 La Joie de Vivre
1947 Portrait de femme au chapeau vert
1948 Nature Morte au Poron (Still Life with Poron), oil on canvas, Welsh National Museum of Art, Cardiff, Wales.
1949 Portrait of Françoise (Buste de Femme), oil on canvas, University of Michigan Museum of Art
1949 Dove, lithograph on paper, Tate
1950 Portrait of a Painter after El Greco
1950 Matador

References

Specific

External links
On-Line Picasso Project - over 10,000 catalogued works.

1941-1950
Picasso 1941-1950
1940s in art